Rabbani is a quasi-traditional Malaysia-based nasheed group and currently consisted 8 members. Best known as a nasyid group that adds more modern aspects to its music. Therefore, making it sound less like a wall percussion.

History

Early beginnings and debut
Rabbani originally debuted on March 1, 1997 with 13 members and led by vocalist, Mohammed Asri Ibrahim. Their first album, a self-titled affair released in 1997 was a success, selling more than 90,000 copies. Their songs such as Assalamualaikum, Munajat and Solla Alaikallah becomes popular.

Breakthrough success and line-up changes
Rabbani released ten more albums by the time of 2005's Suara Takbir. That album was released as a "contribution" to the Islamic holy month of Ramadhan. Rabbani tasted greater success with Pergi Tak Kembali and Intifadha even though it has been criticised. They were accused of producing mixed and shoddy albums thus damaging the image of existing nasyid songs through their innovative courage solely for commercial pursuit.  They also released three compilation albums, the most recent being 2004's Yalla Beena! (English: Let's Go!). After the death of the group leader and main vocalist, Mohamed Asri Ibrahim due to heart attack on August 13, 2009, the position was taken by the other member, Zulkiflee and they continued to promote as 8 members with the released of new album Mahabbah on December 18, 2009.

Discography

Malay & Arabic
 Rabbani (1997)
 Arah (1998)
 Pergi Tak Kembali (1999)
 Intifada (2001)
 Aman (2001)
 Qiblat (2002)
 Epik (2003)
 Suara Takbir (2005)
 Maulana (2007)
 Nostalgia Nadamurni (2009)
 Mahabbah (2009)
 Maulaya (2011)
 Yang Benar (2016)

Compilation
 Muhammad Ya Habibi (1998)
 Ramadhan Remix (Rabbani/Harakat Madani) (1999)
 Iqrar 1421 (2000)
 Kenangan Lalu (2003)
 Yalla Beena (2004)
 Rabbani 1418-1428H (2008)
 Ketika Cinta (Rabbani, Harakat Madani & Durrani) (2011)
 Lagenda Hit (2011)
 Rabbani - One & Only (2013)
 Terunggul Rabbani (2014)
 Koleksi Emas (2015)

Other notable songs
 Masa Berlalu (2006) - Maulidur Rasul National Level, Stadium Negara
 Dalam KalimahMu (2009) - Nur Ar-Rahman RTM - TV2 Telemovie Theme Song 
 Syahadah (2009) - Syahadah RTM - TV1 Programme Theme Song. Re-sung by other members with revised lyrics and included in Mahabbah album.

Concerts and tours
 Rabbani - Live in Kuwait (2006) : Maharjaan Al Kuwait Enshadi 
 Rabbani - Malam Sinar Maulidur Rasul 1427 Hijrah (2006)
 Rabbani - Malam Sinar Maulidur Rasul 1430 Hijrah (2009) : Stadium Malawati, Shah Alam, Selangor
 Rabbani - Maulidur Rasul 1431 Hijrah (2010) : Taman Tamadun Islam, Pulau Wan Man, Terengganu
 Expo Gaya Hidup Islam (2015): Pusat Dagangan Terengganu (TTC), Kuala Terengganu, Terengganu

References

External links
 Rabbani (M) Production Rabbani Production

Malaysian nasheed groups
Performers of Islamic music
Musical groups established in 1997
EMI Records artists
Warner Music Group artists